Sphaerodactylus dacnicolor,  also known as the Jamaican tailspot sphaero or Eastern Jamaican sharpnosed sphaero, is a species of lizard in the family Sphaerodactylidae . It is endemic to Jamaica.

References

Sphaerodactylus
Reptiles of Jamaica
Endemic fauna of Jamaica
Reptiles described in 1910
Taxa named by Thomas Barbour